Alieu Jatta (born 18 September 1995) is a Gambian international footballer who plays as a defender for Casa Sports.

Career
Born in Farato, he has played club football for Brikama United, Génération Foot and Metz B.

He made his international debut for Gambia in 2016.

References

1995 births
Living people
Gambian footballers
The Gambia international footballers
Brikama United FC players
Génération Foot players
FC Metz players
Association football defenders
Gambian expatriate footballers
Gambian expatriate sportspeople in Senegal
Expatriate footballers in Senegal
Gambian expatriate sportspeople in France
Expatriate footballers in France